Carolus van den Bosch (1597–1665) was a clergyman in the Habsburg Netherlands who served successively as bishop of Bruges (1651–1660) and bishop of Ghent (1660–1665).

Life
Van den Bosch was born in Brussels and baptised in Brussels Minster on 22 May 1597. His parents were Petrus van den Bosch, president of the Council of Namur, and Maria Maes (daughter of Jacobus Maes).

He died in Ghent on 5 April 1665. His monumental tomb in Ghent Cathedral is listed heritage.

References

1597 births
1665 deaths
Bishops of Bruges
Bishops of Ghent